Vijaya Kumari Ganti is a former member of the 13th Lok Sabha from Amalapuram, Andhra Pradesh. She is the widow of Lok Sabha speaker G.M.C. Balayogi and won the by-election (2002) conducted after his death.

Career
The sudden death of Amalapuram MP and Lok Sabha Speaker Ganti Mohana Chandra Balayogi necessitated a by-election for the reserved constituency. Before fielding Balayogi's widow Ganti for the seat, senior members of the Telugu Desam Party (TDP) were considering her nomination to the Rajya Sabha. Ganti herself, being in a state of shock, was reluctant to contest the election and Balyogi's family wanted his sister to succeed him.

The Indian National Congress (INC) didn't contest the by-election and TDP had thought Ganti would win unopposed. Even a legislator of Bharatiya Janata Party was present when she filed her nomination. Only Bahujan Samaj Party and Republican Party of India placed their candidates against her and both forfeited their security deposit. She won by a margin of 3,13,660 votes.

Ganti took her oath of office on the first day of the 2002 monsoon session of the Lok Sabha. For the next general election TDP made Dunna Janardhana Rao its official candidate instead of her.

The spouses of the speakers of Lok Sabha are provided a house in New Delhi. Ganti, however, faced trouble in getting a house allocated.

Personal life
Vijaya Kumari married G.M.C. Balayogi on 16 April 1982. Together they had one son and three daughters. Balayogi died in a helicopter accident on 3 March 2002.

References

Living people
Telugu Desam Party politicians
Women members of the Lok Sabha
India MPs 1999–2004
Lok Sabha members from Andhra Pradesh
Year of birth missing (living people)
20th-century Indian women
20th-century Indian people
21st-century Indian women politicians